Epidromia rotundata is a moth of the family Noctuidae first described by Gottlieb August Wilhelm Herrich-Schäffer in 1869. It is found in the United States from Georgia to southern Florida. It is also recorded from Cuba and from xeric habitats in Mexico on the Yucatan Peninsula and on the west coast of Mexico.

The wingspan is 40–45 mm. The forewings are brown with a purplish tint. The hindwings are similar to the forewings in both color and pattern, but the outer margin is rounded. Adults are on wing from April to September.

References

Moths described in 1869
Calpinae